Nagina Khan is a Pakistani politician who served as a member of the 10th Provincial Assembly of Khyber Pakhtunkhwa.

Education
Khan has a Master of Arts degree.

Political career

Khan was elected to the Provincial Assembly of Khyber Pakhtunkhwa as a candidate of Pakistan Tehreek-e-Insaf on a reserved seat for women in 2013 Pakistani general election. During her tenure as Member of the Khyber Pakhtunkhwa Assembly, she served as the Parliamentary Secretary of Khyber Pakhtunkhwa Assembly for Law and Parliamentary Affairs.

In May 2016, Khan joined a resolution to establish a Women's Caucus in the Provincial Assembly of Khyber Pakhtunkhwa. In March 2018, she was accused of horse-trading in the 2018 Senate election. Following which Imran Khan announced to expel her from the PTI and issued her a show cause notice to explain her position.  In April 2018, she quit PTI and joined Pakistan Peoples Party.

References

Living people
Year of birth missing (living people)
Khyber Pakhtunkhwa MPAs 2013–2018
Women members of the Provincial Assembly of Khyber Pakhtunkhwa
21st-century Pakistani women politicians